"I'm So Excited" is a song by Australian singer Anja Nissen. It was written and produced by Redfoo and will.i.am. The song features vocals from will.i.am and Cody Wise. The song was released on 31 October 2014 and debuted at number 42 on the ARIA Singles Chart, selling 3,023 copies.

Music video
On 24 October 2014 Nissen uploaded a six-second preview of the music video on Facebook. On 31 October, she uploaded the full version, it being later uploaded to her Vevo account. The video, directed by Ernst Weber and Pasha Shapiro, features Nissen singing while being dressed in several different outfits, supposedly part of several covers for the fictional magazines XC/TD & Excited. While she is singing, the words to the song appear as headlines on the magazine covers. The video also features will.i.am & Cody Wise. As of 28 January 2015 the video has generated over 136,000 views on YouTube.

Track listing

Charts

References

2014 singles
2014 debut singles
Anja Nissen songs
Songs written by will.i.am
2014 songs
Songs written by Damien LeRoy
Songs written by Lauren Evans
Songs written by Redfoo
Songs written by Cody Wise